Enderun Colleges is a private non-sectarian undergraduate college situated at the Bonifacio Global City in Taguig, Metro Manila, Philippines.

It was established in 2005, then in its former campus in Wynsum Corporate Plaza in Ortigas Center. In 2008, it moved to its permanent 1.7-hectare campus in McKinley Hill, Bonifacio Global City, Metro Manila.

Enderun takes its name from Enderun, the palace school established in Turkey during the Ottoman Empire where the most promising children were educated.

Enderun Colleges’ bachelor's degree programs are not accredited by the Commission on Higher Education (CHED).

History 
Established in 2005 by a group of business and community leaders, Jack Tuason, Javier Infante, and John Suits, who previously founded Ambergris Solutions, now known as TELUS International Philippines.
Joined by Daniel Perez, an alumnus of Les Roches International School of Hotel Management, with prominent business leaders Jean-Henri Lhuillier  of PJ Lhuillier, Inc., Rosanna Fores of TELUS International Philippines, John Tiu of JTKC Group of Companies, Alvin Lao of Chemrez Technologies, and senior US-based executives from Hyatt Corporation.

In 2006 the college launched with the accreditation of the Philippine Commission on Higher Education (CHED) and with Dr. Lorraine Villanueva as the founding Dean. There were 80 students enrolled in the college's one degree, International Hospitality Management, with specialization in Hotel Administration or Culinary Arts.Formed an academic partnership with Les Roches Swiss Hotel Association Hotel Management School (later renamed as Les Roches International School of Hotel Management in 2007), a top hotel and tourism management college in Switzerland and Spain. The partnership allows Enderun students to earn a Certificate in Hospitality Operations from Les Roches as they study for their Enderun's bachelor's degree.
Located in Ortigas Center’s Wynsum Corporate Plaza, where the college also opened an application restaurant called Restaurant 101, under the leadership of Culinary Head Chef See Cheong Yan.

In 2007 the student population grew by more than 200 students.
Established a partnership with Alain Ducasse Formation or ADF (now renamed as Ducasse Education), the professional training center of well respected chef Alain Ducasse. The partnership gives Enderun’s culinary students the opportunity to earn an ADF certificate as they take their bachelor’s degree. The curriculum integrates the culinary methods of Alain Ducasse himself, one of the world’s most celebrated chefs, into the Enderun Culinary program.

In 2008 Simon Bakker joined as Vice President for Business Development.
Moved to its permanent 1.7-hectare campus in McKinley Hill, Bonifacio Global City.
Holdings company A. Soriano Corporation (ANSCOR) made an investment into Enderun.
Opened Enderun Extension, the continuing education arm of Enderun Colleges.

In 2009 Launched its second program: the Bachelor of Science in Business Administration program, with three majors, Finance and Wealth Management, Business Process Management and Consulting, and Marketing Management (the first two majors are now renamed as Financial Management and Operations Management, respectively).

In 2010 Launched its third program: the Bachelor of Science in Entrepreneurship, which focuses on the Family Enterprise.
 Alain Ducasse visited the college with an industry forum titled “Before Cuisine, There Was Nature,” where Ducasse was keynote speaker. Other presenters were Bel S. Castro, a member of Enderun's F&B faculty, Reto Klauser, area manager and general manager of Makati Shangri-La, Manila, J. Gamboa, executive chef of Cirkulo and Milkyway restaurants and director of Les Toques Blanches, and Amy Besa, owner of the Purple Yam restaurant in New York and author of Memories of Philippine Kitchens.

In 2012 Became the first Global Partner of Thunderbird Online, a professional development group of Thunderbird School of Global Management in Arizona, USA.

Launched the Ducasse Institute Philippines, the first Ducasse Institute outside France].

In 2017 Le Pensuer, Inc., an American business consulting company, acquired the 20% holdings of A. Soriano Corporation (ANSCOR) in Enderun.

Udenna Corporation completed its acquisition of Enderun.

Campus 
Built on nearly 2 hectares in the McKinley Hill area of Bonifacio Global City, the campus currently has four buildings—the enderun tent which is used for private parties and events, the Hotel Administration Center, the College of Business and Entrepreneurship, and Ducasse Institute Philippines. The Hotel Administration Center and the College of Business and Entrepreneurship buildings, inspired by Asian colonial architecture, contain classrooms, faculty rooms, and administration offices. Enderun collaborated with Ducasse Education in conceptualizing and creating the Ducasse Institute Philippines. The design and arrangements were constructed in conformity to the specifications of Ducasse Education. It features state-of-the-art kitchen and teaching facilities. 
Located at the ground floor of the culinary center is Restaurant 101, a student-manned restaurant.

Academics

Bachelor of Science in International Hospitality Management
Enderun offers a Bachelor of Science in International Hospitality Management with specialization in Hotel Administration or Culinary Arts.

For the specialization in Hotel Administration, Enderun is partnered with Les Roches International School of Hotel Management in Switzerland. The partnership allows students to earn a Certificate in Hospitality Operations from Les Roches. The Les Roches certificate program, which is fully integrated into the Enderun curriculum, allows Enderun students who pass a qualifying exam to gain Les Roches certification after only two years of study in the Philippines. After earning the certificate, students have the option of completing their four-year degree at Enderun or of transferring to Les Roches campuses in Switzerland or Marbella, Spain, earning their degree in Europe.

Bachelor of Science in Business Administration
Enderun's Bachelor of Science in Business Administration has four majors under Business Administration – Marketing Management, Operations Management (specialization in Business Process Management and Consulting), Financial Management (specialization in Wealth Management) and Technology Management.

Bachelor of Science in Entrepreneurship (with focus on family enterprise)
The Bachelor of Science in Entrepreneurship is designed for students who want to start a business or expand and develop an existing family business. Students have optional concentrations that are relevant to their business. It offers the opportunity to customize the student's junior and senior year to take advantage of the school's culinary arts and restaurant management programs.

For the Business Administration and Entrepreneurship program, Enderun Colleges is partnered with Thunderbird Online, a professional development division of Thunderbird School of Global Management in Arizona, USA. Students can expect an integration of online learning with in-classroom instruction. Upon completion of a three-course track from Thunderbird Online, students will receive an Executive Certificate in Global Leadership after graduation.

Bachelor of Science in Sustainability
The Bachelor of Science in Sustainability degree, to be launched in 2016, is an interdisciplinary course in Environmental Science, Business Management and Public Policy. The college's newly created Sustainability and Environmental Studies Department is co-chaired by Bryan Benitez McClelland, founder of Bambike Bamboo Bikes and Edmond P. Maceda, sustainability consultant of Megaworld Corporation

References

External links
 Official website
 Continuing Education website

Business schools in the Philippines
Universities and colleges in Metro Manila
Education in Bonifacio Global City
Educational institutions established in 2005
Udenna Corporation
2005 establishments in the Philippines